Olokhan Musayev (born 1979 in Balakan Rayon, Azerbaijan SSR) is a Paralympian athlete from Azerbaijan competing mainly in category F55-56 shot put events.

He competed in the 2008 Summer Paralympics in Beijing, China. There he won a gold medal in the men's F55-56 shot put event.

References

External links
 

1979 births
Living people
People from Balakan District
Paralympic athletes of Azerbaijan
Athletes (track and field) at the 2008 Summer Paralympics
Athletes (track and field) at the 2012 Summer Paralympics
Paralympic gold medalists for Azerbaijan
World record holders in Paralympic athletics
Wheelchair category Paralympic competitors
Medalists at the 2008 Summer Paralympics
Paralympic medalists in athletics (track and field)
Athletes (track and field) at the 2020 Summer Paralympics
Azerbaijani shot putters
21st-century Azerbaijani people